StyleNite is a cultural event organized by Berlin's designer Michael Michalsky. It has evolved from Michalsky's fashion shows and takes place twice a year during Berlin Fashion Week. Since January 2010 the event is officially titled StyleNite.

The event is breaking with the traditions of a conventional fashion show, by combining performances of different art disciplines. Each StyleNite is themed according to the inspirational topic of the latest collection of the designer Michalsky.

Event concept 
Michalsky is considered a „seismograph of society" and his collections are regularly influenced by current developments in society. These topics are picked up as central theme of the StyleNite with the aim to support a free and tolerant exchange between artists and art disciplines. In this respect, the StyleNite is considered a platform for exchange, discussion and contacts. Inherent part of the StyleNite are Michalsky's fashion shows. Alternating locations and elaborate stage-designs are setting the scene for further performances during the event. Part of the program are always live music acts of famous or newcomer bands, show performances, film premieres and fashion shows of other labels. The evening ends with an excessive after show party.

In March 2011 Michalsky announced that the following four StyleNites are going to take place at the Tempodrom in Berlin.

Overview

Artists, models und special features

Music acts

Special features 
 8 July 2008: First live performance of Lady Gaga outside the USA
 21 January 2010: World premiere of the band Hurts
 9 July 2010: The opera singer Nadja Michael performs an aria from Médée on the catwalk
 9 July 2010: Exclusive preview of the Friedrichstadt-Palast revue YMA
 20 January 2011: The company DHL shoots the new TV spot for its global advertising campaign on the StyleNite catwalk
 21 January 2011: German premiere of the Disney film Tron: Legacy
 8 July 2011: Lightperformance by the artist Gert Hof to the song "Nothing Else Matters" by Metallica
 25 August 2011: The art gallery Contributed dedicates an exhibition to the Michalsky StyleNite with fotos and videos by three artists
 20 January 2012: The French-German TV station ARTE films the autumn/winter 2012 Michalsky StyleNite. The documentary is presented by Joachim Winterscheidt and broadcast on ARTE on 21 January 2012.
 18 January 2013: The sneak peek of Disney´s "The Wizard of Oz", with a presentation of three dresses inspired by the main characters of the movie

Stage design 
Michalsky always develops an elaborate and individual stage for each StyleNite interpreting the theme of the evening. For example, the stage of the StyleNite The Great Depression Part II featured a crashed airplane in a pool and thousands of stocks on the catwalk.

Models 
Besides famous models there are always new faces to be spotted at StyleNite.

Michalsky has always ignored the „traditional" requirements for models regarding age, origin and perfection. He would line up handicapped models as well as aged models on the runway at StyleNite. The engagement of the handicapped model Mario Galla at the StyleNite in July 2010 was considered almost scandalous among the fashion scene and caused enormous media response. In January 2011, the models Eveline Hall and Pat Cleveland walked the runway; both women are over 60 years old. The internationally renowned German model Toni Garrn has been a regular among the models at StyleNite for several years. In January 2013 Jimi Blue Ochsenknecht was proud to present his first run on catwalk for Michael Michalsky.

Tickets 
There is no official ticket sale for the event. The invitations are sent exclusively to a limited number of guests. The audience at StyleNite changes each time, consisting of people from fashion, media, politics, art and celebrities.

The organizer provides selected media - mainly fashion magazines, blogs and design journals - with a limited number of tickets that are available for raffles. In single cases tickets are given to the students of Berlin's fashion design academies.

There is a strict door policy at the night of the StyleNite.
This is done because of the many features that this show has to offer. It's very exclusive since it offers the latest of the designer's collection.

Media coverage 
The StyleNite is extensively covered in German and international media. In July 2011 the StyleNite was covered extensively by Chinese media for the first time. Vogue TV China broadcast a report and the Cosmopolitan China dedicated an entire page to the event. On 21 January 2012 the French-German TV station ARTE aired a 90 minutes documentary on the Michalsky StyleNite.

Quotes:
 Spiegel Online: "The most daring combination at Fashion Week"
 Bild: "Mega-Event StyleNite"
 Styleranking: "StyleNite advancing to a major entertainment fashion show"
 FAZ: "Friday night was a big blast. Only (…) Boss is playing in this league."
 The New York Times: "Party Like It's 1929"
 Focus: "Fashion Week-Finale: Pastelltöne und ein schwangeres Model"
 VOGUE: "Preview Michael Michalsky"
 Manager Magazin: "Bloß nicht zu klassisch!"

References

External links 

 Official website of StyleNite
 Website of the designer Michael Michalsky
 Video Channel featuring videos and reports
 Video of the Blitzkids mvt. performance at StyleNite in July 2012 (official YouTube channel)

Fashion events in Germany
High fashion brands
Events in Berlin